Arthur Thomson may refer to:

Arthur Thomson (anatomist) (1858–1935), British academic
Arthur Thomson (naturalist) (1861–1933), Scots naturalist
A. A. Thomson (1894–1968), cricketer and author
Arthur Thomson (physician) (1890–1977), British physician
Arthur Thomson (fanzines) (1927–1990), fanzine writer and artist, magazine illustrator, known as "ATom"
Arthur Thomson (footballer, born 1903) (1903–?), English footballer
Arthur Thomson (footballer, born 1948) (1948–2002), Scottish footballer
Arthur Landsborough Thomson (1890–1977), Scottish ornithologist
Arthur Saunders Thomson (1816–1860), New Zealand military surgeon, medical scientist, writer and historian
Arthur C. Thomson (1871–1946), American prelate

See also
Arthur Tomson (1859–1905), English painter
Arthur Thompson (disambiguation)